Amish preaching soup is a type of bean soup in American cuisine. It was typically served preceding or following Amish church services. Some versions are prepared with beans and ham hocks.

See also
 List of bean soups
 List of soups

References

Further reading
 

American soups
Amish
Bean soups